Lego Trains is a product range and theme of the construction toy Lego, which incorporates buildable train sets. The Lego Trains theme became a sub-theme of Lego City in 2006. Products in the range have included locomotives, tracks, rolling stock, stations, signal boxes, and other track-side buildings and accessories. The theme is popular among adult fans, as well as children, and has spawned international associations and conventions. The train system is sometimes referred to as 'L-gauge' among Lego fans, in reference to traditional model railway scales.

Development 

The design of Lego trains has developed substantially, with several different systems introduced, with varying degrees of cross-compatibility.

The Blue Era (1966-80) 

Lego trains were first introduced in 1966 with Lego set number 080. The train sets used blue rails, and the first train sets were simply push-along. Set number 115 introduced 4.5 volt battery-operated trains (initially the battery box was handheld, but train sets soon contained a railcar that carried the battery box), and train sets numbered 720 (1969) and up operated on 12-volt electrified rails, introduced in 1969. In 1972, 4.5-volt trains gained a monolithic railcar that carried the batteries and contained both a bottom-mounted stop button to be actuated by signals, as well as a side-mounted lever for manual go/stop/back control and tripping by a track-side pivot. All three kinds (push trains, 4.5-volt battery-operated trains and 12-volt electric trains) existed alongside each other and even allowed for upgrades. The motors were the same size, the push trains used a motor-shaped dummy block of bricks, and all used the same wheel style. These wheels had the same press-fit metal axles as used in the two larger sizes of rubber-tire Lego wheels, which also meant that both 4.5-volt and 12-volt motors were not restricted to use in trains. A push train could be updated to a battery-operated train, and a battery-operated train could be updated to an electric train. Since 1969 the motor housings for 4.5-volt and 12-volt are equal and can be equipped with either a 4.5-volt or 12-volt Bühler motor unit. These motor units were sold separately as a replacement part until around 1990. In or before 1976, the 4.5-volt motor gained a hole for driving the then white cross-axles of the size that would later be known as Technic. Railcars began as spartan constructions of train-specific wheels and couplers attached to car bases made from universal plates and bricks, but these were quickly replaced by black single-piece bases in two lengths that included captive wheels and couplings.

The Gray Era (1980-91)

In 1980 the trains theme received a major overhaul (although in some markets, the second generation system was not introduced until 1981). The builds were adapted to the minifigure, which had been introduced in 1978, with buildings that were intended to integrate with the new Town theme.  The colour of the tracks was changed from blue to grey, and the 12-volt transformer changed to support utility functions in a more streamlined style with control switches that docked alongside the transformer, following the design style of increasingly streamlined model train controls of the time. The utility functions now included remotely controlled points, signals, wagon de-couplers and level crossings. The models gained a much more realistic appearance, including some with much longer carriage/wagon bodies and swivel bogies, and there were special windows which simulated having a pull-down glass section. Stickers were included allowing the owner to bedeck their trains with symbols of several European railway companies, such as DB, ÖBB, NS, SBB, DSB, NSB and British Rail. The railcar bases were now again assembled from train-specific wheels and coupler and a greatly increased number of universal pieces.  As with the previous generation, the electrical parts such as the train motor (7865) and the mains transformer unit (7864) were manufactured by Bühler on behalf of Lego.  The transformer unit was also compatible with Technic motors.

Battery-operated trains were still available. The motor was kept unchanged. Upgrading a battery-operated train to a 12-volt electric train required changes to the train to fit the smaller, redesigned 12-volt motor underneath. The fixed wheels of the new 12-volt motor were black, finalizing the color scheme that had developed in the blue-track era, where 12-volt locomotives started to be distinguished by black wheels.

The 1980 train catalog and ideas book (7777) enticed Lego fans with nighttime dioramas featuring lampposts and lights inside the trains. Even though light bricks of the same size were available in both 12-volt and 4.5-volt guise, the train headlight/taillight (using unique prisms and holder bricks) and lamppost sets were normally only available with the expensive 12-volt light bricks included.  Making these theoretically universal features available only as 12-volt items served to further elevate the 12-volt system away from the more limited 4.5-volt system. 

Notable train sets include the Electric Intercity (7740) and Steam Locomotive (7750), particularly for its large wheel pieces which were not found in any other set.  7750 and the 7727 Goods Train also featured a red version of the 12V motor module that also has become a very rare and sought after component.  Owners with a worn out red motor had no option but to replace it with a standard black one (7865) or break open the sealed unit and transplant the components.

The 12-volt line was promoted in a 1983 UK television advert featuring a group of adults planning a 'mail train robbery'.

No new sets for the 12-volt system were introduced after 1986, although the full range remained on sale leading up to its eventual replacement in 1991.  Lego continued to supply accessories (but not complete sets) for the 12V system via its mail order service until 1993.

The Nine-Volt Era (1991-2007) 

1991 saw again a major overhaul in the train line, in line with the ongoing transition to the new generation 9-volt system that had first appeared in 1986 with the 'Light & Sound' line of sets, with Technic having made the transition to 9-volt the year before.  Tracks gained a new appearance with power being transmitted directly through metal strips on the two running rails. The new line abandoned the 12-volt power in favor of the 9-volt system.  One of the key weaknesses of the old 4.5V/12V system was the unreliability of the pinned connector plugs, which were notorious for becoming loose or for the wires to fracture over time, whilst the 9-volt system used more positive fitting contacts integrated into the brick studs. The remote-controlled accessories from the 12-volt system however were also abandoned, with only manual point control available and no signaling capabilities. At the same time, the 9-volt train motor was made train-specific by its fixed wheels, while the similarly sized 9-volt universal motor changed from individual metal axles wheel holes to axle holes for Technic axles, for which there were no train wheels available.  
Previous 12-volt locomotives were not compatible with the new system without modification, due to the change in voltage and means of powering the motor, although it was possible to retrofit them with 9-volt motors. The gauge did not change, therefore older rolling stock could still be used.

The continuing availability of the train system was thrown into doubt in 2006, with the release of the first 'remote control' train sets, which used battery-powered motors and did not have metal conducting strips in the tracks. For about a year, both systems were available, with the 9-volt system being marketed under a "Hobby Train" brand, available direct from Lego. By the end of 2007, the 9-volt system had been discontinued.

RC Trains 

In 2006, Lego introduced a new line of remote control trains. In an effort to reduce the cost of the track, Lego returned to making track entirely made out of plastic (foregoing the metal rails), and introduced a new train motor powered by batteries and controlled via an infrared remote control. To enable the models to be battery-powered, the powered vehicles had a specific train base, which was 6 studs wide to accommodate a snap-fitting battery pack.

The new battery-powered system had some advantages over the 9-volt trains; it allowed more than one train to be controlled independently at once, and track layouts did not have to worry about matching up the polarity of the rails. However, the infrared remote control introduced problems of range, and the use of batteries required them to be replaced or recharged at regular intervals.

The lower production costs of the plastic track allowed Lego to introduce a new double crossover track piece (first produced in 2007, now discontinued), and the track itself was available at a cheaper price than the 9-volt track.

The Power Functions Era (2007-present) 

On 1 October 2007 Lego announced that they would discontinue both the 9-volt and the RC train formats in favour of a new system. The announcement cited a lack of sufficient demand for the 9-volt product line to be profitable, caused partly by the need to replace key machinery and place minimum orders for motors and power regulators. The new range was announced as launching in 2009, and would use the new 'Power Functions' system also used in the Technic line, which would allow the company to "amortize the development and on going cost across multiple themes".

A new train was introduced in the summer of 2009 called the "Emerald Night", modelled on a steam locomotive. This train was sold without a motor as set number 10194. Necessary part numbers were listed on the rear of the box to convert the Emerald Night to a Power Functions compatible train.  These parts were available separately, but mainly online.  There was an additional 'collection' pack available with all the necessary parts to power the Emerald Night.  These included a rechargeable battery box, a new infrared remote controller, plus a Power Functions motor and infrared receiver.  Although this is a "Power Functions" setup, this particular setup existed only for the Emerald Night, as a new motor was in development.

The track was unchanged from the RC Trains sets, and in 2009 flexible track was introduced.

Following the Emerald Night, the new 88002 Power Functions-compatible train motor and controller were introduced in two 2010 sets, the 7938 Passenger Train and 7939 Cargo Train.  This new motor utilized the universal Power Functions connections, used by all components.  The standardization of the Power Functions system meant that any of the motors in the Power Functions line could be used and builders were not limited to using a single type of motor as they had been with previous Lego train systems.

Powered Up 

In 2018, Lego introduced a new Power Functions system, known as Powered Up, or Power Functions 2.0. This system was brought to replace the old Power Functions brought about in 2009. This system was introduced with the Passenger Train (set number: 60197) and the Cargo Train (set number: 60198). In 2019, the Disney Train was released, with the motorised elements in the tender. In 2020, the Lego Crocodile Locomotive was released, designed to be motorised with Powered Up Large Motor, not the usual train motor. In June 2022 LEGO introduced the Express Passenger Train (set number: 60337) and Cargo Train (set number: 60336), also powered by Powered Up, which features the ability of the train to be controlled via Bluetooth and a smartphone app.

Track gauge
This is 
circa 5.5 mm wider than O gauge ( – ).

The  length is not derived by a certain scale ratio. While HO scale is a 1:87 scale (3.5 mm to 1 foot), resulting in a  gauge from real life prototype . Conversely, modeling standard gauge into Lego trains would require a scaling of (37.5:1435 =) circa 1:38. With this scale, a minifigure (height ) in real life size would be .

Community 

Lego trains are popular among adult fans of Lego, and Lego Train clubs around the world.

A number of these Lego train clubs exhibit large model train layouts at various community functions, train shows, and Lego conventions, such as BrickFest. Some of the largest layouts in the United States have been the result of ILTCO's (International Lego Train Club Organization) lead combined efforts by several train clubs at the 2005, 2006, and 2007 National Model Railroad Association national conventions. Lego has also introduced train sets designed by members of the Lego community, for example, Santa Fe set by James Mathis, and the Train Factory set in March 2007.

The community was also supported by a magazine about Lego trains called Railbricks, created by Jeramy Spurgeon and written by Lego train fans from around the world. Railbricks is no longer active.

A computer program called Track designer was created by Matt Bates to help fans plan track layouts. This program is no longer supported, but was the inspiration for similar programs such as TrackDraw by Cary Clark (no longer supported), and BlueBrick by Alban Nanty which is still supported at the time of writing.

In late December 2016, prominent train builder Cale Leiphart along with several others created Brick Model Railroader (BMR), which was created to replace Railbricks as a hub of the train building community. Brick Model Railroader is a news and blog site with the intention of spreading insightful ideas and techniques to all fans of Lego trains. They also now offer 'Premium Instruction Kits', which are instructions for train models, from their store.

See also 
 Lego City
 Lego Loco

References

Further reading 

 Getting Started with Lego Trains. Authored by Jacob H. McKee. Published by No Starch Press, 2004. .
 Lego Train Adventure Rhyming StoryBook : Riding a Lego Train. Authored by Kyle K. Published by Createspace Independent Publishing Platform, 2016. 
 The LEGO Trains Book. Authored by Holger Matthes. Published by No Starch Press, 2017. .
 High-Tech LEGO. Authored by Grady Koch. Published by No Starch Press, 2020. 
 LEGO Train Projects. Authored by Charles Pritchett. Published by No Starch Press, 2020. .

External links 
 Lego Trains on Brickset
 Bill Ward's Brickpile: Track Layout Geometry

Train
Toy trains
Rail transport modelling
Lego
1960s toys
Products introduced in 1966